Sunnyvale is a former village in northern Newton County, Missouri.  It merged with Joplin in 1987.  Joplin surrounded the village on all sides except for Midway on the west, which also merged with Joplin.  Its northern boundary with Joplin was Missouri Supplemental Route FF, also known as 32nd Street.

Former populated places in Newton County, Missouri
Former villages in Missouri
Populated places disestablished in 1987
Former populated places in Missouri